The Georgia XV team are the second national rugby union team behind the Georgia national rugby union team. Georgia XV matches are usually used as a stepping stone up to Lelos selection. It was formed in 2018 by the Georgian Rugby Union.

Summer Cup 2018 
<noinclude>

Current squad

2018 Squad 
Squad for Summer Cup 2018

Head Coach:  Besik Khamashuridze

Old Squad 
The most recent Scott of Georgia A national team is the following player who was convened in Wales and England expedition in March 2012.
Kote Mikautaze was suspended for 6 weeks due to withdrawal from the first round of the Escher RFC game, so Jabba Kikuvize was replaced and added.

Record

Overall 

Georgia XV has won 1 of their 3 representative matches, a winning record of 33.33%.

Below is table of the representative rugby matches played by a Georgia XV team at test level up until 16 March 2019.

References

XV
Second national rugby union teams